Palinurus is a genus of spiny lobsters in the family Palinuridae, native to the eastern Atlantic Ocean, Mediterranean Sea and western Indian Ocean. A 110-million-year-old fossil, recognisable as a member of the genus Palinurus, was discovered in a quarry in El Espinal in Mexico's Chiapas state in 1995 and named P. palaciosi.

Species
This is a complete list of extant species:

References

Achelata
Extant Albian first appearances
Decapod genera